Khvoshinan-e Olya (also Romanized as Khvoshīnān-e ‘Olyā, Khowshīnān-e ‘Olyā, and Khūshīnān-e ‘Olyā; also known as Bābā Khān, Khushinān Isfandīār, Khvoshīnān-e Bālā, and Khvoshīnān-e Esfandīār) is a village in Miyan Darband Rural District, in the Central District of Kermanshah County, Kermanshah Province, Iran. At the 2006 census, its population was 356, in 78 families.

References 

Populated places in Kermanshah County